Wang Wupin (Simplified Chinese:王乌品；born 18 January 1991) is a Chinese track and field athlete who competes in the long jump and triple jump. She was the gold medallist in the triple jump at the 2015 Asian Athletics Championships.

Her earliest successes came in the long jump, an event in which she was a medallist at the World Junior Championships in Athletics in 2010 and Asian Indoor Athletics Championships in 2012.

Career
The latter mark ranked her the second best junior category athlete in the world that season, behind Russia's Darya Klishina. At the 2010 World Junior Championships in Athletics she entered as the highest ranked athlete in the competition. Her last round effort of  left her in the silver medal position behind Cuba's Irisdaymi Herrera.

She failed to better that outdoors, placing eleventh at the 2011 Asian Athletics Championships, but continued with strong indoor performances the following year by taking her first senior medal – a bronze – at the 2012 Asian Indoor Athletics Championships on home soil in Hangzhou. She was beaten by her younger national rival, Lu Minjia. Her next major outing was the 2013 Asian Athletics Championships, where she was her country's only representative in the women's long jump, and she finished down in eighth at the competition. She did not jump much beyond six metres that year. Her best of the season was at the 12th Chinese National Games, where she jumped  for third while representing her native Fujian. She returned to the site of her first medal at the 2014 Asian Indoor Athletics Championships, but finished in sixth while her countrywoman Jiang Yanfei took bronze.

It was the first time she ranked higher internationally in the triple jump rather than the long jump, as she edged into the top 90.

Personal bests
Long jump outdoor –  (2010)
Triple jump outdoor –  (2015)
Long jump indoor –  (2013)
Triple jump indoor –  (2015)

International competitions

References

External links

Living people
1991 births
Athletes from Fujian
Chinese female long jumpers
Chinese female triple jumpers
World Athletics Championships athletes for China
Athletes (track and field) at the 2018 Asian Games
Asian Games competitors for China
21st-century Chinese women